Bruff is a town in east County Limerick, in the midwest of Ireland, located on the old Limerick–Cork road (R512). The town lies on the Morning Star river, with two bridges in the town itself. The horseshoe lake of Lough Gur is nearby.

Name
The town's official name in Irish is An Brú, historically written as Brugh. Older spellings in English, dating from 1200 onward, include Brug, Browe and Broff. Because of its close association with the Anglo-Norman de Lacy family, the town's name was also rendered in Irish as Brú an Léisigh; it is believed that a modern name for the town, Brú na nDéise, is a corruption of this name that was popularised from the early 1900s on.

History

Historical artefacts found around the area date back to the Stone Age, with various buildings up to the early Christian era still extant. Bruff is the hometown of the American missionary and bishop John Joseph Hogan. In the sixteenth century, it was granted to the Standish family, from whom it passed by inheritance to the Hartstonge Baronets, and ultimately to the Earl of Limerick.

The town suffered heavy fighting in the Battle of Killmallock during the Irish Civil War. Near the Catholic Church, there is a large statue of Sean Wall, commander of the East Limerick Irish Republican Army and chairman of Limerick County Council until his death on 6May 1921 during the War of Independence.

The former seat of the O'Grady family, Kilballyowen, is near Bruff.

The US President John F. Kennedy was a descendant of the Fitzgeralds of Bruff. His daughter, Caroline Kennedy, visited the town in May 2013 with her husband and son.

Sport
The town has an active Gaelic Athletic Association Club, Pitch & Putt club, hockey club, soccer club, and rugby union. Bruff R.F.C. is home club of John Hayes, the Ireland rugby union international. Bruff is home to Limerick F.C.'s Kirby O'Sullivan Sports, Social and Business Park.

Development and economy
Bruff town has been classified as a satellite town of Limerick City. Major expansion for the town is laid out in the development plan published by Limerick County Council in 2012. 

Ard Scoil Mhuire, the only secondary school in the town, has been closed down, its former campus is now home to the Kirby O'Sullivan Sports, Social and Business Park.

Tourism

Bruff's Cultural and Arts Society organises an Annual Summer Festival, an event held annually since its inception in 2006. It includes the Morning Star Rose Competition and the Morning Star Escort Competition (since 2008). The Sean Wall Committee organise a "Bloomsday in Bruff" festival every year on 16 June.

A number of murals have been painted on the walls of buildings in the town over the last few decades.

There are four pubs (one with a restaurant), two restaurants (The Bakehouse Restaurant and The Lantern), a Eurospar, a Centra, a pharmacy, a B&B and a Post Office in the town.The Bank of Ireland branch in the town closed permanently in October 2021.

Bruff is located near the edges of the Ballyhoura Fáilte tourist area.

Accommodation in the town is provided in what used to be the old AIB Bank, known as "The Old Bank", which had also served as the Garda station in the town.

People
 James David Bourchier (1850-1920), journalist, Balkans correspondent of The Times
 Paul Browne (1989-), hurler.
 George Clancy (1881-1921), Mayor of Limerick.
 George Clancy (1977-), international rugby union referee.  
 John Crimmin (1859-1945), Victoria Cross recipient.
 Marie Curtin (1985-), Republic of Ireland women's international footballer 
 Seán Finn (1996-), hurler.
 Anthony O'Riordan (1966-), hurler.

See also
 List of towns and villages in Ireland

References

External links

 Visit Bruff

Towns and villages in County Limerick